This is a list of portraiture offerings with Ancient Egyptian hieroglyphs.

The two major uses of Egyptian language hieroglyph offerings are the wall reliefs, and statuary; minor uses might be thought of as minor statues, charms, or amulets. Many of the sphinx statues are shown with an offering vessel.

List of common offering vessels
This list is incomplete; you can help by expanding it.

The common nu pot W24 is the iconography where all offering pots are based. A simple one based on it is the incense censor pot, with a flame of smoke, .

Many other types of offerings, represented by Egyptian language hieroglyphs are made, by the pharaoh himself/herself in portraiture, or by the gods that are portrayed with offerings.

Incense pot

Items from the Gardiner's Sign List of Temple Furniture and Sacred Emblems, (section R).

Censer pot, with vapors-R7.
Censer arm-R5.
Offering of an altar-R2.

Liquid vessels

Liquid vessels.

Vessel with liquid stream-W15.
Common nu vessel-W24.

Other miscellaneous offerings
Bread-X3-(bread-(Gardiner-no-x3)).
Bread-cone-X8(verb-(TO-GIVE-(GIVEN))). (see here:)
Field of Dreams-M20-(field-of-reeds).
Joint of meat-F44. (see here: 
Life symbol: Ankh-S34-(life-(s34)). (see here: 
Ointment jar-(Alabastron)-W1-.-(or)-.-W2-(jar-alabastron). (see here: 
Recumbent sphinx, lion-E23-(sphinx).
Ripple of Water-N35-(ripple-of-water).

Gallery of statuary with offering vessels

Monumental type

Minor-sized statuary

See also
List of Egyptian hieroglyphs by common name: A-L
List of Egyptian hieroglyphs by common name: M-Z
List of Egyptian hieroglyphs by alphabetization

Art of ancient Egypt
Egyptian hieroglyphs
Portraiture offerings